.cm is the country code top-level domain (ccTLD) for Cameroon.  

The official registrar for .cm domains is Netcom.cm, based in Yaoundé, the capital of Cameroon. Netcom.cm Sarl was founded in early 2008 as a partner of ANTIC, the information technology regulator for Cameroon. On October 15, 2008, NETCOM.cm Sarl  launched the registry service for .com.cm, .co.cm and .net.cm. The current version of .cm domains went live August 27, 2009.

History
In August 2006, it was reported that the .cm registry had set up a wildcard DNS record, so that all unregistered domains in this top-level domain go to a parking page with paid search links. This was likely intended to take advantage of typographical errors by users attempting to reach .com web sites.

Auctions of .cm domains have been as high as $81,000 in 2009 for what pitchmen have termed "prime real estate". However, some bloggers have noted that nothing of any real value was actually put up for auction, despite the price war.
Namejet.com, the official auction site for the .CM domain registrar Netcom.cm, sold over $500,000 in .cm domain names the first day and over $2 million in the first week.

Reputation
In a report published in December 2009 by McAfee, "Mapping the Mal Web - The world's riskiest domain", .cm was reportedly the riskiest domain in the world, with 36.7% of the sites posing a security risk to PCs. It is widely assumed that malicious domain programmers rely on inadvertent misspellings of well-trafficked websites ending in ".com" to lure unsuspecting users to their domains.

The .cm top-level domain is also used for domain name hacks by legitimate organizations, such as the CyanogenMod project, which used get.cm as an easily remembered URL shortener for distributing versions of its software, and The Hill, which uses hill.cm as a URL shortener when linking to its articles on social media.

References

External links
.cm whois information - Official Registrar Netcom.CM
.cm official domain registrar for .cm Cameroon
Article about the man who profits from redirecting all the unregistered .cm domains
IANA .cm whois information
cnet.com: McAfee uncovers riskiest domains 

Country code top-level domains
Communications in Cameroon
Science and technology in Cameroon

he:סיומת אינטרנט#טבלת סיומות המדינות
sv:Toppdomän#C